The Yamaha SHS-10, known in  Yamaha's native country, Japan, as the Yamaha Sholky, Sholky being derived from "Shoulder Keyboard", is a keytar (a musical keyboard that can be held like a guitar) manufactured by Yamaha and released in 1987.

It has a small-sized keyboard with 32 minikeys and a pitch-bend wheel, vibrato and sustain buttons, an internal Frequency modulation (usually referred to as FM) synthesizer offering 25 different voices with 6-note polyphony, two operators, and a very basic chord sequencer. It also has a loudspeaker.

It supports MIDI, having a MIDI Out connector which allows the keyboard to control external MIDI equipment. It does not have a MIDI In connector. Although originally made for the consumer market, this keytar's MIDI out features are very powerful. Its drum rhythms and accompaniment are transmitted on separate MIDI channels, so that an external drum machine, sampler, or other MIDI equipment can be programmed to play the backing parts. Drums are transmitted on channel 16; Bass on 15; and three chord harmonies on channels 12-14. MIDI start/stop and tempo sync are also transmitted so an external sequencer may be utilized as well.

It was manufactured in three colors: grey, red, and black.

Its demo is an arrangement of Wham!'s hit "Last Christmas."

The Voices are the following:

The numbering scheme reflects the fact that the selection is done with buttons numbered 0-4.

A larger model, the Yamaha SHS-200, was released the following year, and came with 49 keys and dual stereo speakers.

External links
 Yamaha SHS-10 at SynthMania (featuring MP3 samples of the demo, instruments, and styles available)
 Yamaha SHS-10 reviews at Harmony Central

References

Keytars
SHS-10
Polyphonic synthesizers
Digital synthesizers
Products introduced in 1987